The Norwegian Women's Cup is a knockout cup competition in Norwegian women's football. It has been organised annually since 1978. The final is usually played on a Saturday, the day before the men's cup final. The current champions are Brann, who won their second title in 2022.

List of finals
The finals so far:

Performance by club

See also
Norwegian Football Cup

References

External links
Cup at soccerway.com
Cup at fotball.no

 
1978 establishments in Norway
Recurring sporting events established in 1978
Norway
Women's football competitions in Norway